, also known as , is a Japanese weekend school in the San Diego metropolitan area.

 classes are held at Madison High School in Clairemont, San Diego, while the school office is in another location in San Diego.

History
It was established in 1978, meaning San Diego-based Japanese people who previously attended Asahi Gakuen in the Los Angeles area now had their own Japanese weekend school. Initially the school was based in the Clairemont neighborhood in San Diego.

Initially it had 40 pupils grouped into four classes. In 1988 the enrollment was almost 300, and almost 70% of the students were at the elementary school level. Classes were held in 22 temporary buildings at Wagenheim Junior High School in Mira Mesa, San Diego. In 1996 Minato Gakuen switched to holding classes at Eastlake High School in Chula Vista. The South County Economic Development Council (EDC) helped broker an agreement between Minato Gakuen and the party that operates Eastlake High, Sweetwater Union High School District. The expected enrollment post-move was a total of 500 students. The board of directors planned to donate funds to the school district as a part of the agreement. In July 1996 the school district's board of directors formally accepted the donation, totaling $10,000. School offices were located in a separate area.

Several students, as of 1997, had parents who worked for the San Diego area Sony offices and other Japanese companies.

In 2015 the school began holding its classes at Madison High.

References

Further reading
 Articles by former school staff
 Ogura, Keiichi (小倉 恵一 Ogura Keiichi). "サンディエゴ補習授業校における高等部活性化のひとつの試み : 高等部改革と生徒会の発足." 在外教育施設における指導実践記録 24, 153-157, 2001. Tokyo Gakugei University. See profile at CiNii.

External links
 Minato Gakuen 

1978 establishments in California
Asian-American culture in San Diego
Japanese-American culture in California
Educational institutions established in 1978
Schools in San Diego
Schools in San Diego County, California
San Diego
Education in Chula Vista, California